Pardon My Genie (1972–73) was a children's comedy series  produced by British ITV contractor Thames Television, and written by Bob Block, who later created Rentaghost.

The premise was that a magic genie (Hugh Paddick in the first series, Arthur White in the second series) appeared in present-day Britain, summoned by a young apprentice named Hal Adden, a pun that goes some way towards characterising the series. Various comical misunderstandings arise, primarily aimed at youngsters. Arthur White replaced Paddick for the second run of 13 episodes. Throughout both series, Hal was played by Ellis Jones, with Roy Barraclough as his long-suffering boss, Mr. Cobbledick. In achieving "magic" effects, it contains examples of early "blue-screen" technology.

The first series of 13 episodes was released on DVD on 22 September 2009. The second series of 13 episodes was released on 1 July 2013.

External links

1970s British children's television series
1972 British television series debuts
1973 British television series endings
British supernatural television shows
ITV children's television shows
Television shows produced by Thames Television
English-language television shows